Zakaria Mansouri (born 1 November 1995) is an Algerian footballer who plays for Al-Ahly SC.

Club career
In January 2017, Mansouri signed an 18-month loan contract with MC Alger.

In 2018, he signed an 18-month loan contract with MC Oran.
In 2020, he signed a one-year loan contract with CS Sfaxien.

In 2021, he joined JS Kabylie.

In 2023, he joined Al-Ahly SC.

References

External links
 
 

1995 births
Algerian footballers
Algerian Ligue Professionnelle 1 players
Algerian Ligue 2 players
Living people
Paradou AC players
MC Alger players
MC Oran players
CS Sfaxien players
People from Tlemcen
Association football forwards
21st-century Algerian people